The longhorn beetles (Cerambycidae), also known as long-horned or longicorns (whose larvae are often referred to as roundheaded borers), are a large family of beetles, with over 35,000 species described. Most species are characterized by extremely long antennae, which are often as long as or longer than the beetle's body. In various members of the family, however, the antennae are quite short (e.g., Neandra brunnea) and such species can be difficult to distinguish from related beetle families such as the Chrysomelidae. The scientific name of this beetle family goes back to a figure from Greek mythology: after an argument with nymphs, the shepherd Cerambus was transformed into a large beetle with horns.

Description
Other than the typical long antennal length, the most consistently distinctive feature of adults of this family is that the antennal sockets are located on low tubercles on the face; other beetles with long antennae lack these tubercles, and cerambycids with short antennae still possess them. They otherwise vary greatly in size, shape, sculpture, and coloration. A number of species mimic ants, bees, and wasps, though a majority of species are cryptically colored.

Larvae are 0.5-22 cm long, elongate in shape and lightly sclerotised. The prothorax is often enlarged and the sides of the body have lateral swellings (ampullae). The head is usually retracted into the prothorax and bears well-sclerotised mouthparts. The legs range from moderately developed to absent. The spiracles are always annular.

Biology

All known longhorn beetle larvae feed on plant tissue such as stems, trunks, or roots of both herbaceous and woody plants, often in injured or weak trees. A few species are serious pests. The larvae, called roundheaded borers, bore into wood, where they can cause extensive damage to either living trees or untreated lumber (or, occasionally, to wood in buildings; the old-house borer, Hylotrupes bajulus, is a particular problem indoors).

It is known that many longhorns locate and recognize potential hosts by detecting chemical attractants, including monoterpenes (compounds released en masse by woody plants when stressed), ethanol (another compound emitted by damaged plant material), and even bark beetle pheromones. Many scolytinids share the cerambycid's niche of weakened or recently deceased trees; thus, by locating scolytinids, a suitable host can likely be located as well. The arrival of cerambycid larvae is often detrimental to a population of scolytinids, as the cerambycid larvae will typically either outcompete them with their greater size and mobility, or act as direct predators of them (this latter practice is less common, but has been observed in several species, notably Monochamus carolinensis). Cerambycids, in turn, have been found to play a role in attracting other wood-borers to a host. Borgemeister, et al. 1998, recorded that cerambycid activity in girdled twigs released volatiles attractive to some bostrichids, especially Prostephanus truncatus. A few cerambycids, such as Arhopalus sp., are adapted to take advantage of trees recently killed or injured by forest fires by detecting and pursuing smoke volatiles.

Predators

Parasitoids
In North America native Cerambycids are widely the victims of Ontsira mellipes. O. mellipes may be useful in controlling a forestry pest in this same family, Anoplophora glabripennis, that is invasive in North America. (Ontsira is a genus of parasitoid wasps in the Doryctinae.)

Classification

As with many large families, different authorities have tended to recognize many different subfamilies, or sometimes split subfamilies off as separate families entirely (e.g., Disteniidae, Oxypeltidae, and Vesperidae); there is thus some instability and controversy regarding the constituency of the Cerambycidae. There are few truly defining features for the group as a whole, at least as adults, as there are occasional species or species groups which may lack any given feature; the family and its closest relatives, therefore, constitute a taxonomically difficult group, and relationships of the various lineages are still poorly understood. The oldest unambiguous fossils of the family are Cretoprionus and Sinopraecipuus from Yixian Formation of Inner Mongolia and Liaoning, China, dating to the Aptian stage of the Early Cretaceous, approximately 122 million years ago. The former genus was assigned to the subfamily Prioninae in its original description, while the latter could not be placed in any extant subfamily. Qitianniu from the mid-Cretaceous Burmese amber of Myanmar, dating to approximately 100 million years ago, also could not be placed in any extant subfamily.

Subfamilies
The eight subfamilies are:

 Cerambycinae Latreille, 1802
 Dorcasominae Lacordaire, 1869 (including former Apatophyseinae Lacordaire, 1869)
 Lamiinae Latreille, 1825
 Lepturinae Latreille, 1802
 Necydalinae Latreille, 1825
 Parandrinae Blanchard, 1845
 Prioninae Latreille, 1802
 Spondylidinae Audinet-Serville, 1832 (including former Aseminae Thomson, 1860)

Notable genera and species

 Acrocinus longimanus – harlequin beetle, a large species where the male has very long front legs
 Anoplophora chinensis – citrus long-horned beetle, a major pest
 Anoplophora glabripennis – Asian long-horned beetle, an invasive pest species
 Aridaeus thoracicus – tiger longicorn (Australia)
Cacosceles newmannii - Southern African longhorn beetle that is a surgacane pest
 Desmocerus californicus dimorphus – valley elderberry longhorn beetle, a threatened subspecies from California
 Moneilema – cactus longhorn beetles, which are flightless
 Onychocerus albitarsis – the only known beetle with a venomous sting
 Petrognatha gigas – giant African longhorn beetle
 Prionoplus reticularis – huhu beetle, the heaviest beetle in New Zealand
 Rosalia alpina – Rosalia longhorn beetle, a threatened European species
 Tetraopes tetrophthalmus – red milkweed beetle, a toxic species with aposematic colors
 Tetropium fuscum – brown spruce longhorn beetle, an invasive pest species
 Titanus giganteus – titan beetle, one of the largest beetles in the world

See also
 List of longhorn beetle (Cerambycidae) species recorded in Britain

References

Further reading
 Monné, Miguel A. & Hovore, Frank T. (2005) Electronic Checklist of the Cerambycidae of the Western Hemisphere. PDF Cerambycids.com

External links

 Photo gallery "Longhorn beetles (Cerambycidae) of the West Palaearctic Region"
  and  Catalogs of New World and Old World Cerambycidae, respectively
 Cerambycidae of French Guiana
 National Museu, Rio, Brazil Holotype images
 Iberodorcadion Coleoptera, Cerambycidae, Dorcadion - RedIRIS
 VIDEOS - Longicornes (Dorcadion, Cerambycidae, Coleoptera) 
 Cerambycidae of Borneo pdf
 BugGuide.net - Longhorned Beetles (Cerambycidae)
 Anoplophora chinensis, citrus longhorned beetle on the University of Florida / Institute of Food and Agricultural Sciences Featured Creatures website
 Coleoptera: Cerambycidae, University of Florida, Dept. of Entomology and Nematology
 Wood-boring beetles of the World

 

Beetle families
Insect families
Polyphaga families